Feuerbach (in its upper course: Metzgerbach) is a river of Baden-Württemberg, Germany. It passes northwest of Stuttgart, and flows into the Neckar in the Stadtteil Stuttgart-Mühlhausen.

See also
List of rivers of Baden-Württemberg

References

Rivers of Baden-Württemberg
Rivers of Germany